Iaeger High School in Iaeger, West Virginia was a Grade 9 through 12 High School, part of the McDowell County Schools District. It was located in the city of Iaeger and offered a wide range of academics and athletics to students including certain college and AP classes, along with football, baseball, golf, softball, volleyball, and basketball. Iaeger High School closed after the 2009-2010 school term and consolidated with nearby Big Creek High School to form Riverview High School.

Mascot and colors
Iaeger High School's colors were Old Gold and Royal Blue. Its mascot was the Cub.

Notable alumni
John Brewer, American football player

See also
McDowell County Schools
List of high schools in West Virginia
Education in West Virginia

External links
Iaeger High School
Iaeger High Football
Iaeger High Alumni
Iaeger High School Band of Gold
Iaeger High Alumni Forum

Defunct schools in West Virginia
Educational institutions disestablished in 2010
Educational institutions established in 1918
Former school buildings in the United States
Schools in McDowell County, West Virginia
1918 establishments in West Virginia